The Church of the Holy Family also known as the Chapel of the Holy Family, is a Catholic church building located in the Austrian Hospice in the Old City of Jerusalem.

The church building originated as a pilgrim hostel of the Catholic Church created in 1853 by the Austrians in Jerusalem (Österreichisches Hospiz zur Heiligen Familie). The chapel of the complex was ceremonially consecrated 19 March 1863 by the Latin Patriarch of Jerusalem Giuseppe Valerga, open to pilgrims of the Latin rite.

The liturgical organ of the chapel was built in 1910 by the Rieger organ manufacturer of Jägerndorf (now Krnov) in the Czech Republic (in 1910 in Austria-Hungary).

See also
Catholic Church in Israel
Latin Patriarchate of Jerusalem

References

Holy Family
Roman Catholic churches completed in 1863
Roman Catholic chapels in Jerusalem
19th-century Roman Catholic church buildings in Israel